is a Japanese goalball player who won a gold medal at the 2012 Summer Paralympics.

She has albinism which caused her visual impairment. She started playing goalball when she was 16. Her father Mitsunori Kakehata (欠端光則) played professional baseball for the Yokohama Taiyo Whales (now Yokohama DeNA BayStars).

References 

Paralympic gold medalists for Japan
Goalball players at the 2012 Summer Paralympics
Goalball players at the 2016 Summer Paralympics
Sportspeople from Yokohama
1993 births
Living people
Medalists at the 2012 Summer Paralympics
Paralympic goalball players of Japan
Female goalball players
People with albinism
Paralympic medalists in goalball
Goalball players at the 2020 Summer Paralympics
20th-century Japanese women
21st-century Japanese women